Joan Crespo Sistiaga (born 29 January 1988) is a Spanish slalom canoeist who has competed at the international level since 2004.

He won four medals at the ICF Canoe Slalom World Championships with a gold (K1 team: 2019) and three bronzes (K1: 2019, 2021, K1 team: 2009). He also won a bronze medal in the K1 team event at the 2016 European Championships in Liptovský Mikuláš.

World Cup individual podiums

References

12 September 2009 final results for the men's K-1 team event at the 2009 ICF Canoe Slalom World Championships. – accessed 12 September 2009.

External links

Living people
Spanish male canoeists
1988 births
Medalists at the ICF Canoe Slalom World Championships
Sportspeople from San Sebastián
Canoeists from the Basque Country (autonomous community)